Outeiro may refer to the following places in Portugal:

 Outeiro (Bragança), a civil parish in the municipality of Bragança
 Outeiro (Cabeceiras de Basto), a civil parish in the municipality of Cabeceiras de Basto 
 Outeiro (Montalegre), a civil parish in the municipality of Montalegre
 Campelos e Outeiro da Cabeça, a civil parish in the municipality of Torres Vedras
 Outeiro (Viana do Castelo), a civil parish in the municipality of Viana do Castelo